The 2021 Western North America heat wave was an extreme heat wave that affected much of Western North America from late June through mid-July 2021. Extreme event attribution found this was a 1000-year weather event, made 150 times more likely by climate change, but a study in Nature Climate Change estimated it was a 200-year event. The heat wave affected Northern California, Idaho, Western Nevada, Oregon, and Washington in the United States, as well as British Columbia, and in its latter phase, Alberta, Manitoba, the Northwest Territories, Saskatchewan, and Yukon, all in Canada. It also affected inland regions of Central and Southern California, Northwestern and Southern Nevada and parts of Montana, though the temperature anomalies were not as extreme as in the regions farther north.

The heat wave appeared due to an exceptionally strong ridge centered over the area, whose strength was linked to the effects of climate change. It resulted in some of the highest temperatures ever recorded in the region, including the highest temperature ever measured in Canada at 49.6 °C (121.3 °F), as well as the highest temperatures in British Columbia, in the Northwest Territories, in the state of Washington as well as a tied record in Oregon. The record-high temperatures associated with the heat wave stretched from Oregon to northern Manitoba, and daily highs were set as far east as Labrador and as far southwest as Southern California. However, the Pacific Northwest suffered the vast majority of the disruption and damage connected with the extreme weather event.

The heat wave sparked numerous extensive wildfires, some reaching hundreds of square kilometers in area, which led to widespread disruption on the roads. One of them destroyed the village of Lytton, British Columbia, the day after it had set a record high temperature for Canada. The heat also damaged the road and rail infrastructure, forced closures of businesses, disrupted cultural events, and melted snowcaps, in some cases resulting in flooding. The heat wave also caused extensive damage to crops across the region, which was seen as likely to result in higher food prices globally, though the losses have yet to be calculated. The National Oceanic and Atmospheric Administration (NOAA) estimated that the heatwave caused at least $8.9 billion (2021 USD) in damages in the USA.

The death toll exceeded 1,400 people, with a death toll of at least 808 estimated in western Canada. On July 6, the British Columbia Coroner Service released preliminary statistics that indicated 610 more sudden deaths than usual occurred in the province. Alberta logged 66 excess deaths the week of the heat wave. The Chief Coroner of British Columbia later said that in the week between June 25 to July 1, 569 deaths were confirmed to have had heat-related causes, and in a report released June 2022, the number was updated to 619. Confirmed deaths in the United States include at least 116 in Oregon (of which 72 are in Multnomah County, which includes Portland), and at least 112 in Washington and one death in Idaho; An analysis by The New York Times suggests that around 600 excess deaths occurred the week the heat wave passed through Washington and Oregon.

Meteorological history

On June 23, the United States National Weather Service warned of an approaching heat wave in the Pacific Northwest, whose origins could be traced to torrential rains in China. There, the warm, moist air rose and was eventually entrained by the jet stream, which transported it east over cooler waters. When that air current encountered an upper-level high-pressure zone, also called a ridge, it started to significantly deform on June 25, forcing to accommodate the high-pressure area south of the jet stream's meander. At the same time, the Southwestern states were enduring an intense drought, which had earlier allowed higher-than-average temperatures over the Southwestern United States, leading to a similar hot wave earlier in June. Its remnants then moved north to the Pacific Northwest. Six days later, Environment Canada issued a heat warning for Alberta, Saskatchewan, British Columbia, Manitoba, Yukon, and Northwest Territories.

These conditions made way for a massive Rex block, which is more often formed during La Niña years. In this situation, a high-pressure area stays in place for a long time and does not let cyclones pass through it, which could have cooled the region; in this particular case, the high-pressure area was sandwiched between two stationary lows, which prevented the high-pressure region from moving anywhere. As the Pacific Northwest, just as the Southwest, experienced severe drought conditions, the already warm air was heating more quickly than usual, which intensified the ridge so strongly it caused a heat dome. The downslope winds from the Cascades and other mountain ranges further warmed the air in the valleys.

After the heat dome hovered over British Columbia and the Northwestern United States for a few days, it began to move eastward, breaking records east of the Rocky Mountains, particularly in the northern parts of the Prairie provinces, but bringing relief to the Pacific coast. At this stage, the heat was kept between the warm and cold fronts of the low-pressure area that formed over southern Northwest Territories and was transported eastward towards Hudson Bay. Sweltering conditions were observed as far east as Montana, Manitoba, and Northwest Ontario, 

Climate change and additional factors 
Climate change in Canada and in the United States are widely considered to have worsened the heat wave's unprecedented intensity and duration. According to a preliminary study, which has not yet been peer-reviewed, the heat wave would have been highly unlikely in the absence of anthropogenic climate change, the latter increasing the likelihood of such a heat wave at least 150-fold. According to this study, either the climate change made the heat wave more likely by increasing base temperatures and a combination of rare events, such as the recent drought and/or changes in the jet stream, resulted in the heat wave, or even a relatively small increase in mean global temperatures caused by climate change can pass a threshold that triggers a sharp increase in the probability of extreme heat wave phenomena.

While it is yet unknown whether the frequency of these omega blocks is due to global heating, according to the data provided by Verisk, the Pacific Northwest is among the fastest-heating regions in the continental United States and southern Canada. Moreover, the urban heat island effect could have further exacerbated the impact in cities. Based on historic data, several meteorologists noted that this phenomenon should be expected to occur only once over a thousand or several thousand years, and David Sauchyn, a scientist at the University of Regina, said that climate models had been predicting the heat wave of a similar intensity to happen in late 2020s at the earliest.

Temperature records
In fact, the temperatures were so anomalous that nighttime lows were higher than the average high temperatures that this region would normally observe at this time of year. Ground temperatures were also reaching extremes - in Wenatchee, Washington, it reached .

This heat wave, combined with other extreme weather occurrences elsewhere, yielded the hottest June on record in North America. It also contributed to the hottest June ever for some localities such as Victoria, Abbotsford, Kamloops and Edmonton, and in Portland, Oregon, as well as one of the hottest June mean temperatures for Seattle and Spokane. On a statewide level, June 2021 was the warmest on record in California, Nevada, Arizona, Utah and Idaho, and second warmest for Washington, Oregon and Montana, at least partly attributable to this heat wave.

Canada 
The highest temperatures of the heat wave were registered in British Columbia, but areas as far east as Ontario were affected by the event.  103 all-time heat records were set across Western Canada.

British Columbia 

On June 27, local records were also set in Cultus Lake, Lillooet, Ashcroft and Kamloops. In all, there were 59 weather stations in B.C. that set records for hottest temperatures recorded for June 27.

On June 29, the temperature in Lytton, British Columbia, hit , the highest temperature ever recorded in Canada, although a nearby more modern station reported that the extreme was 1 °C lower. The stations were temporarily isolated by the Lytton wildfire the next day. It is also the highest temperature ever recorded north of 45°N, the highest temperature in the U.S. or Canada recorded outside the Desert Southwest, and higher than the absolute maximum temperatures of Europe or South America.

Alberta 
In Alberta, the highest heat was observed in the period from June 29 to July 1. Banff , Beaverlodge , Cochrane , Fort McMurray , Jasper , Grande Prairie , Hendrickson Creek , Nordegg , Red Earth Creek  all saw the strongest heat ever measured in these communities, most after breaking all-time records of the previous day.

Calgary noted  on June 29 and July 1, which stopped just 0.2 °C short of the highest observed temperature ever and beating the all-time records for June and July. The heat wave had largely moved east by July 2, though e.g. Fort McMurray measured its fourth daily record in a row on that date.

Territories 
Two days later, Fort Smith, just north of the Alberta border, reached , which beat the previous all-time territorial record, registered in the same place in 1941. It was also the new highest reliably recorded temperature above 60 degrees latitude.

Saskatchewan 
Saskatchewan's heat records were mainly concentrated in the northern parts of the province. July highs were also observed in these settlements on the first day of the month, when 26 daily records were set across the province, most in northern communities.

Elsewhere, the heat arrived slightly later. The heat wave over Saskatchewan largely dissipated by July 3 and moved east.

Manitoba 
In a similar way to Saskatchewan, the majority of heat records (including all-time highs) were noted in the northern parts of the province.

Other parts of the province did not see heat as extreme as elsewhere, though 25 daily records were set on July 3, including  in Winnipeg.

Ontario 

Newfoundland and Labrador 
Weakened by interaction with the Hudson Bay waters, and having not set any record in Quebec, the heat wave arrived to the mainland part of Newfoundland and Labrador, but before dissipating in the Atlantic Ocean, it still managed to beat some daily records. Hopedale registered  on July 5, while Happy Valley-Goose Bay reached  the following day.

United States
The heat wave broke numerous records by large margins. Several large cities, including Portland, Seattle, and Spokane, experienced high temperatures far exceeding  and low temperatures higher than the area's normal daily high temperatures. The heat wave beat Washington's all-time heat record in Hanford and tied one for Oregon ( at two places, including at Pelton Dam).

Oregon 
These extremes also beat the previous record June temperature,  set on June 26, 2006.

Salem, Oregon, reached  on June 26, its record high temperature for June. It then hit  degrees on June 27, breaking the record for the highest temperature ever recorded in that city, which was previously . However, not all the regions of the mid-Willamette Valley experienced extreme heat on June 28. Regions south of Salem, for example, did not see highs above mid-90s Fahrenheit on that day, likely due to cooler ocean air in the area.

Washington 

All of these values broke the previous June record (2017) by a large margin.

On Mount Rainier, normally freezing temperatures reached  degrees above  on June 27. The heat wave was blamed for greater glacier melt on Mt. Rainier than had been seen in the state in the past 100 years.

East of the Cascades, multiple locations such as Spokane measured record-breaking or -tying temperatures, beating several records over the period of a few days. These are the hottest temperatures measured since records began for those areas.

It was even hotter on and near the Oregon-Washington border. In The Dalles, Oregon and Dallesport, on either side of the Columbia River, daytime high temperatures reached , tying the then all-time record for the state of Washington and beating the June statewide record by 5 degrees Fahrenheit. The same heat was measured in Tri-Cities on June 28–29. The heat wave resulted in 128 all-time high temperature records set for individual weather stations across the state, including in Seattle.

California 
Temperature records were observed in the northern part of the state. South Lake Tahoe observed  on June 28, beating the previous June record, and tied or beaten daily records for three days in a row.

Southern California was also impacted. Palm Springs registered  on June 27, surpassing the previous daily record, while other communities, such as Palmdale, Campo and Idyllwild, tied with them.

Idaho 
Being largely on the margin of the high pressure dome, Idaho did not see temperatures as extreme as elsewhere. In Lewiston, on the border with Washington,  was noted on June 29, beating an all-time June record and becoming the third-highest temperature in the history of recordings for the city. Other localities in the Treasure Valley to the east were expected to sustain triple-digit heat for a week (which is in and of itself unusual) and in general to tie or beat daily records. Boise, for example, tied one for June 29 and for June 30, and also recorded nine consecutive days of temperatures exceeding , which tied the record for such a streak. Records were also beaten in the Idaho Panhandle, with Coeur d'Alene registering , which surpassed the previous highest temperature for June and equaled the all-time high for the city.

Montana 
Most of Montana was placed on heat advisories, but the areas that were most affected by the heat wave were on the extreme northwest and eastern parts of the state.

Deaths and injuries

Canada 

The heat wave was the deadliest weather event in Canadian history.

Over 1,000 deaths occurred due to the direct consequences of the heat wave (such as hyperthermia). Most of the deaths occurred in Canada – about 600 more deaths than usual were noted in British Columbia and 66 in Alberta. It still unknown whether any of the excess deaths in Alberta were related to the heat wave, but the Chief Coroner of British Columbia stated that 569 casualties could be attributed to heat. A later report put the heat-related death toll at 619. She also said that in the prior five years, only three heat-related casualties had been registered. Among the deaths reported to the provincial coroner, Fraser and Vancouver Coastal health authorities saw several times more deaths than usual, and the Vancouver Island and Interior Health health districts noted double the expected number of dead during the week from June 25 to July 1. Most of the deaths were registered on June 29.

Delays for non-emergency calls reached up to 16 hours in extreme cases. In addition to that, some ambulances were left inoperable as the emergency service was understaffed. These setbacks led to hours-long delays. The handling of the crisis drew criticism from the paramedics unions, which forced Adrian Dix, the provincial healthcare minister, to change the leader of British Columbia's emergencies response management to Jim Chu, former Vancouver's police chief, and to appoint a chief ambulance officer.

United States 
In the United States, the death toll was lower but still in the hundreds: at least 116 deaths with confirmed heat-related causes in Oregon (72 in Multnomah County), at least 112 in Washington and one in Idaho. The New York Times analysis suggested that almost 450 excess deaths in Washington and 160 deaths in Oregon occurred during the heat wave, though it has not been demonstrated how many were related to the heat. For comparison, however, Oregon had only 12 heat-related deaths 2017–2019. Most of the deaths occurred among the elderly.

On July 13, 2021, Multnomah County, Oregon published an analysis which found that a majority of deaths occurred in households which had no air conditioning or had only fans.

A surge in 9-1-1 calls and emergency department visits related to the heat saw 1,100 people were hospitalized in Oregon and Washington; and almost 2,800 heat-related emergency department visits were made on July 25–30. The Washington Department of Health estimated that over 2,000 such visits occurred statewide, not including visits to Veteran Administration or the military hospitals. In Portland, the number of calls and the response times doubled, setting a record for the area. On the other hand, in Oregon, while the number of heat-related visits skyrocketed, the total number of emergency visits stayed in the expected range. Non-emergency municipal services were also strained—on June 26, the non-emergency health information service (2-1-1) did not respond to 750 heat-related calls due to lack of working staff.

Some deaths also occurred among those seeking cooling in the Pacific Northwest's rivers. Two swimmers in Salem, who were trying to escape the heat, went missing in the Willamette River, another did so in Portland, while in Washington, three people drowned. With 30 deaths in King County, it was the deadliest weather event in the county. In fact, with 112 deaths, this became the deadliest weather event in Washington State history. The total damage in Washington State was between $500 million and $1 billion.

Impact

Air conditioning 
The heat wave was a problem for major cities in the Northwest. Seattle and Portland had the lowest and third-lowest percentage of air-conditioned households among major metro areas in the United States, respectively. In 2015, a U.S. Census Bureau survey found that only 33% of Seattle homes have air conditioning (A/C) units, but that number increased to 44% in the 2019 survey, likely due to the warming trend in that area (Portland had 79% coverage, which was still below the national average). The rate of air-conditioned households was even lower in British Columbia despite marked increases over the years – BC Hydro estimated that only 34% of the province's residents were using these cooling appliances, while a separate analysis indicated that only 21% of Metro Vancouver's households used air conditioning in 2017 (the number was only slightly higher for Edmonton and Calgary, at 29% and 24%, respectively). Authorities therefore waived restrictions related to COVID-19 for designated cooling shelters in Oregon, Washington, and British Columbia.

Trying to stay cool, residents in the Pacific Northwest and Alberta rushed to buy A/C units, which significantly increased their prices (some double the normal), created long installation and delivery backlogs, and ultimately made them unavailable in many stores. The pent-up demand for cooling forced electricity consumption to soar to record-high summer values. BC Hydro reported a peak of 8,500 MW, AESO registered 11,721 MW (8 MW short of an all-time high), SaskPower recorded 3,547 MW, while several electricity providers in Washington also logged record values. It also prompted power utilities in Alberta, Idaho (Idaho Power) and eastern Washington (Avista) to formally ask to conserve energy. The warning had the Idaho State Capitol voluntarily turn off lights as a result, while in the Spokane area, power outages were rolled in an attempt to prevent strain on the power grid.

Some residents chose to shelter from the heat by booking rooms in hotels, which often ran out of air-conditioned accommodation. According to CoStar calculations, the search for cooled rooms made the hotel occupancy in British Columbia reach the highest levels since the beginning of the COVID-19 pandemic, while Washington County, Oregon (suburbs of Portland) hotels reported occupancy levels at or exceeding  of total capacity on June 26–28, more than double the rate from 2020.

Infrastructure 

The heat wave strained and damaged the region's infrastructure. It caused the sidewalks to buckle due to thermal expansion of concrete (57 sidewalks were damaged in Edmonton alone). In Washington and Oregon, damage was even more severe, leading to closures of roads and other inconveniences for drivers, including on some lanes of Interstate 5, as well as some state highways.  In order to prevent thermal fatigue to Seattle's steel drawbridges, the city announced it would hose them down with cool water.

Public transportation also deteriorated during the sweltering conditions. Trains on Link light rail and Sounder commuter rail in Seattle operated at reduced speeds as a precaution against possible deformation of railroad tracks and overhead lines. In the Portland metropolitan area, TriMet suspended MAX Light Rail and WES Commuter Rail service for part of June 27 and all of June 28 because the cables from which the light rail cars drew electricity had sagged. Heat-induced rail distortion, called sun kink, slowed down the passenger service on the route of the Amtrak Cascades. Moreover, school districts in Kamloops, Sooke (BC), Ephrata and Royal City (WA) all suspended school bus services, while Grant County, Washington limited the frequency of the buses under their management as they did not offer air conditioning or the built-in version could not cope with the heat.

On June 28, 15 school districts in British Columbia's Lower Mainland, including all districts within Vancouver, closed due to the heat and their lack of sufficient cooling infrastructure; many others also changed, or shortened, Tuesday schedules to avoid daytime high temperatures. COVID-19 vaccination sites also endured disruption because of the weather conditions.

Businesses and workers 
Local businesses faced a choice to continue to work under oppressive heat or make a day off. Some restaurants, food stands and cafés closed, fearing excessive heat at the workplace or spoilage of solid products. Similarly, numerous grocers were forced to shut down aisles and halt the sale of perishable goods or use plastic sheets as impromptu thermal shields, as refrigeration units failed under the load. The businesses that decided to stay open often provided de facto sheltering from heat or converted parts of buildings to cooling centers, such as Amazon.

In a few cases, workers in California and Oregon protested the lack of air conditioning and staged local walkouts, and agricultural trade unions had also noted increased calls to strike. An SMS survey among 2,176 farmworkers in Washington (mostly in the eastern part of the state) conducted by United Farm Workers, a labor union, reported that almost all farmers did not consider protections mandated by the state OSHA sufficient. Among the surveyed, about two-fifths reported not having had shade, just under a third not having received heat illness prevention training and a quarter of respondents had no access to cool water.

After Sebastian Francisco Perez, an outdoor farm worker in St. Paul, Oregon, died while at work, Oregon OSHA faced calls to enforce safety rules for dealing with the heat wave, which had been first drafted in May. In response, Oregon's governor, Kate Brown, directed the agency to enforce the safety regulations for 180 days pending permanent implementation. In Washington state, the heat wave prompted state agencies to roll out additional protections. The Washington Post reported that the federal Occupational Safety and Health Administration was also considering a set of heat-related safety rules, whose implementation was said to be a "top priority" for the Biden administration.

Culture and sports 
Sports events were disrupted by the heat wave. In Eugene, where the qualifiers for the 2020 Summer Olympics were held, the heat caused evacuation of the stadium in the afternoon and postponement of some events to the evening hours, as the temperature of the stadium's track exceeded . It also caused an athlete to withdraw from the race.

Among other disruptions, a public swimming pool in Seattle's Rainier Beach neighborhood was closed due to dangerously high deck temperatures, so was a senior's center in Rathdrum, Idaho and a golf course on Vancouver Island. Some local concerts were also moved to avoid the heat.

Agriculture 

Farms have experienced serious losses, as the heat wave baked the fruits and berries or otherwise destroyed the crop and the drought conditions worsened.

10 million pounds of fruit a day were being harvested in the Pacific Northwest at the time the heat wave struck. Farmers in Eastern Washington, facing a loss of the cherry and blueberry crop, sent workers into orchards at night to avoid the heat in the day. The British Columbia provincial fruit growers association estimated that 50 to 70 percent of the cherry crop was damaged, effectively "cooked" in the orchards. Raspberry and blackberry farms in the Lower Mainland, Oregon and Washington have also endured losses. In Whatcom County, Washington, which produces four-fifths of raspberries in the United States, estimates varied from quarter to half of the harvest; elsewhere, they went as high as 80-90%. Lettuce producers in the Okanagan Valley were also reported to be struggling with spoilt crops, so were those who grew Christmas trees and apples. In contrast, grapevines in Oregon and Washington did not seem to have sustained much damage, and corn in Skagit County, Washington was growing much ahead of schedule.

Farmers in the United States have also seen reduced yields of soft wheat, which additionally saw the quality deteriorate (68% of wheat harvest in the Pacific Northwest was estimated by the USDA to be of poor or very poor condition). In the Prairie provinces, an infestation of grasshoppers is threatening cash crops and farmers were reported to be struggling with feeding cattle as hay and forage was found to be in short supply. Saskatchewan has therefore extended additional drought support for farmers. In Alberta, lack of rain and excessive heat saw some grain plants catch fire, which has put the harvest in jeopardy. Beaumont, Alberta issued a mandatory ban on non-essential water usage, citing drought conditions. Further east, St. Laurent and Armstrong, Manitoba declared a "state of agricultural disaster" as the heat wave worsened the drought in the region, whose water reserves were already depleted.

Environment

Wildfires 

The heat event sparked significant fires across the West Coast and Western Canada. Strong winds, which were causing fire tornadoes in some places, and dry vegetation hampered efforts to contain the fires. This led to road closures, such as the U.S. Route 97 and the North Cascades Highway, suspension of airport operations in Redmond, Oregon, and evacuation of settlements adjacent to the fires. The winds were so strong that residents of Medford, Oregon,   north of the fires, reported having seen ash falling from the sky.

Among the most known fires was the one that burst in the evening of June 30 in British Columbia. Then, Lytton, the settlement that had been beating national heat records in the previous days, along with several First Nations reserves, were ordered to be evacuated as a likely human-caused fire was approaching to the village, where it later did widespread destruction to the buildings. A local MP, Brad Vis, estimated damage to the settlement at 90%, while a local resident said that only "four or five houses, the post office and the church were still standing." The fire damaged roads, telecommunication and power facilities as well as the railway that comes through the settlement; two people died while hiding from the flames. The fire in the settlement forced the closure of a section of British Columbia Highway 1, part of Trans-Canada Highway, as well as Highway 12, which ends in Lytton. Pyrocumulonimbus clouds formed due to such extensive burning, producing several hundred thousand lightning strikes in one day and further complicating efforts to contain fires.

Despite deployment of more than 9,000 firefighters in the United States to extinguish them by July 1 and more than 17,000 by mid-July, the size and number of the fires grew. The intensity of the fires moved the US fire preparedness alert level to 5 (highest) by July 14, which was an early start of the wildfire season. In addition to that, Governors Kate Brown of Oregon, Jay Inslee of Washington and Brad Little of Idaho declared states of emergency due to the extreme risk of wildfires. The Canadian army officials set up a coordination center in Edmonton in order to assist wildfire actions in British Columbia, which would be directed until July 19. Higher-than-average burning also appeared in Albertan, Saskatchewan and Manitoba forests.

As the extreme heat and dry conditions persisted, scientists, firefighters and various politicians urged residents not to use fireworks during Independence Day celebrations in the Western United States and on Canada Day in Alberta. In addition to that, Washington and British Columbia enacted state-/provincewide bans on most open fires, and Washington authorities also issuing a total fire ban in state parks. Idaho and Manitoba were using more regionalized approaches, though the latter suspended all burning permits provincewide.

Glacier melt 
Extreme temperatures were also noted for mountain regions, which accelerated the melting of glaciers. Extensive melting occurred in the snowcaps of Banff National Park, which a glaciologist estimated that the Albertan snow from the mountains melted three times faster than usual. On Mount Rainier, the heat wave caused the mass of the snow cap to shrink by 30%, and Washington's glaciers in general have come through what glaciologists say to be the strongest melting episode in 100 years. Additionally, the increased melting of glaciers caused high amounts of runoff to be present within some rivers. The unexpected snowmelt blocked some high mountain roads in Whatcom County, Washington and rendered three hiking trails in British Columbia impassable. More importantly, it caused flash flooding down the creeks and rivers, which the glaciers feed. This triggered i.a. a week-long evacuation order in the Pemberton Valley extreme water rises were also noted in Squamish, and flood alerts were issued for other parts of British Columbia. Soot from wildfires (→ 2021 British Columbia wildfires) is further expected to diminish the mass of ice.

Wildlife and fisheries
As the surrounding air was extremely hot, water temperatures rose, which proved to be a hazard for aquatic wildlife. The deaths also impacted seafood producers, who faced losses of produce as it baked in the heatwave and started rotting. Inland, the population of sockeye salmon in Idaho rivers was preventatively caught out of water as increasing temperatures made it prone to disease; some salmon was also transported to cooler waters in the Columbia River. Fish kill, however, was not prevented in Albertan aquifers and appeared earlier than expected.

The heat wave caused an increase in vibrio bacteria levels in oysters in the Pacific Northwest, causing a record number of people to be sickened from vibriosis, an intestinal disease caused by the bacteria. The Washington State Department of Health urged people not to eat raw oysters and other shellfish from the region due to the risk of bacterial contamination.

On the land, trees in Metro Vancouver dried up and started shedding leaves; the same happened to the fir canopy in Oregon on the side where the trees faced the sun, and reportedly also in Lytton just before the wildfire swept through the community. Birds have also come through distress - in Seattle, nearly a hundred juvenile terns, whose nests were on top of an industrial building, died when they plunged to the pavement below, presumably trying to escape the heat - those that survived were treated for burns. Scores of British Columbian raptors, apart from heat exhaustion, were suffering from dehydration and starvation.

See also
2020–22 North American drought
2021 Kazakhstan heatwave
2021 Russia heatwave
2021 wildfire season
February 2021 North American cold wave

References

Further reading

External links
 
 www.worldweatherattribution.org: 
 Western North American extreme heat virtually impossible without human-caused climate change (7. Juli 2021) 
 Rapid attribution analysis of the extraordinary heatwave on the Pacific Coast of the US and Canada June 2021 pdf (8,6 MB)

2021 meteorology
2021 disasters in Canada
2021 natural disasters in the United States
2021 heat waves
2021 in Alberta
2021 in British Columbia
2021 in Oregon
2021 in Saskatchewan
2021 in the Northwest Territories
2021 in Washington (state)
2021 in Yukon
Heat waves in Canada
Heat waves in the United States
July 2021 events in Canada
July 2021 events in the United States
June 2021 events in Canada
June 2021 events in the United States